When Disco Ruled the World is a music documentary that aired on VH1 in 2005.

Overview
The series documented the impact that disco music had on popular culture in the 1970s. The show featured several disco innovators and people related to the culture including:

 Marty Angelo - Producer, Disco Step-by-Step
 Charlie Anzalone - Club DJ
 Maurice Brahms - Club owner, Infinity
 Harry Wayne Casey - Lead singer of KC and the Sunshine Band
 Joe Causi - Radio DJ
 Carmen D’alessio - Co-Founder of Studio 54
 Billy Fajardo - Dancer
 Michael Fesco - Club owner of Flamingo
 Gloria Gaynor - Singer
 Karen Lynn Gorney - Actress, Saturday Night Fever
 Merv Griffin - Creator of Dance Fever 
 Debbie Harry - Lead singer of Blondie
 Janice-Marie Johnson - Singer with A Taste of Honey
 Baird Jones - Studio 54 doorman 
 David Mancuso - Club owner, The Loft
 Steve Marcus - Producer of Disco Magic television show
 Giorgio Moroder - Record producer
 Tom Moulton - Record producer/mixer
 Michael Musto - Journalist
 Richard Long - Richard Long and Associates [sound system designer for Studio 54, Paradise Garage and many other major clubs]
 Richard Notar - Studio 54 owner Steve Rubell’s driver
 Anita Pointer - Singer with the Pointer Sisters
 Nile Rodgers - Producer and member of Chic
 Nicky Siano - Club Deejay
 Annie Sprinkle, Ph.D. - Adult Entertainer
 Henry Stone - Founder of TK Records
 Deney Terrio - Host of Dance Fever
 Maurice White - Founder and lead singer of Earth, Wind & Fire

External links
 When Disco Ruled the Worldat VH1.com 
 

American documentary television films
Documentary films about pop music and musicians